The Mahāyāna Mahāparinirvāṇa Sūtra (Sanskrit; , ; Vietnamese: Kinh Đại Bát Niết Bàn) or Nirvana Sutra is Mahāyāna Buddhist sutra of the Buddha-nature genre. Its precise date of origin is uncertain, but its early form may have developed in or by the second century CE. The original Sanskrit text is not extant except for a small number of fragments, but it survives in Chinese and Tibetan translation.

The Nirvana sutra was translated into Chinese twice from two apparently substantially different source texts, with the 421 CE translation of Dharmakṣema being about four times longer than the 416 translation of Faxian (as well as the later Tibetan version). The two versions also differ in their teachings on Buddha-nature: Dharmakṣema's indicates all sentient beings have the potential to attain Buddhahood, but Faxian's states some will never attain Buddhahood. Ultimately, Dharmakṣema's version was far more popular in East Asia and his version of the text had a strong impact on East Asian Buddhism.

This sutra should not be confused with the early Buddhist Mahaparinibbana sutta.

History

Versions
The text of the Mahāparinirvāṇa Sūtra in the original Sanskrit has survived only in a number of fragments, which were discovered in Central Asia, Afghanistan and Japan. It exists in Chinese and Tibetan versions of varying lengths. There are four extant versions of the sūtra, each translated from various Sanskrit editions:
 The "six fascicle text", the translation into Chinese by Faxian and Buddhabhadra, translated during the Jin dynasty (266–420) between 416 and 418, containing six fascicles, which is the shortest and earliest version;
This version was also translated into Classical Tibetan from the Chinese. According to C. V. Jones, this version of the text is "around four times the length" of the Faxian version and the later Tibetan translation.
 The "southern text", with 36 fascicles, edited in approximately 453 by Huiguan and Huiyan during the Liu Song dynasty, integrated and amended the translations of Faxian and  into a single edition of thirty-six fascicles;
 The Tibetan version (translated in the early ninth century) by Jinamitra, Jñānagarbha, and Devacandra;

According to Hodge, some other versions have also existed:
 a secondary Chinese version of Dharmakṣema's translation, completed in 453 CE. This was produced "by polishing the style and adding new section headings";
 Chinese catalogues of translations mention two other Chinese translations, slightly earlier than Faxian, which are no longer extant.

Origins and development
According to Shimoda Masahiro, the authors of the Mahāparinirvāṇa Sūtra were  leaders and advocates of stupa-worship. The term buddhadhātu originally referred to śarīra or physical relics of the Buddha. The authors of the Mahāparinirvāṇa Sūtra used the teachings of the Tathāgatagarbha Sūtra to reshape the worship of the śarīra into worship of the inner Buddha as a principle of salvation: the Buddha-nature. "Buddhadhātu" came to be used in place of tathagatagarbha, referring to a concrete entity existing inside the person. Sasaki, in a review of Shimoda, conveys a key premise of Shimoda's work, namely, that the origins of Mahayana Buddhism and the Mahāparinirvāṇa Sūtra are entwined.

The Indian version of the Mahāparinirvāṇa Sūtra underwent a number of stages in its composition. Masahiro Shimoda discerns two versions:
 a short proto-Nirvāṇa Sūtra, which was, he argues, probably not distinctively Mahāyāna, but quasi-Mahāsāṃghika in origin and would date to 100 CE, if not even earlier;
 an expanded version of this core text was then developed and would have comprised chapters 1, 2, 3, 4, 6 and 7 of the Faxian and Tibetan versions, though it is believed that in their present state there is a degree of editorial addition in them from the later phases of development.

The sutra was further developed in China by the Chinese translator Dharmakṣema in the fifth century CE, who added a thirty extra fascicles to the original core text.

Dating

Scholars believe that the compilation of the core portion (corresponding to the Faxian and Tibetan translations) must have occurred at an early date, during or prior to the 2nd century CE, based internal evidence and on Chinese canonical catalogs.

Using textual evidence in the Mahāyāna Mahāparinirvāṇa Sūtra and related texts, Stephen Hodge estimates a compilation period between 100 CE and 220 CE for the Mahāyāna Mahāparinirvāṇa Sūtra. Hodge summarizes his findings as follows:

Place of origin and Indian dissemination
The history of the text is extremely complex, but the consensus view is that the core portion of this sutra was compiled in the Indian subcontinent, possibly in Andhra, South India.

The language used in the sūtra and related texts seems to indicate a region in southern India during the time of the Śātavāhana dynasty. The Śātavāhana rulers gave rich patronage to Buddhism, and were involved with the development of the cave temples at Karla and Ajaṇṭā, and also with the Great Amarāvati Stupa. During this time, the Śātavāhana dynasty also maintained extensive links with the Kuṣāṇa Empire.

According to Stephen Hodge, internal textual evidence in the Aṅgulimālīya Sūtra, Mahābherihāraka Parivarta Sūtra, and the Mahāparinirvāṇa Sūtra indicates that these texts were first circulated in South India and they then gradually propagated up to the northwest, with Kashmir being the other major center. The Aṅgulimālīya Sūtra gives a more detailed account by mentioning the points of distribution as including South India, the Vindhya Range, Bharuch, and Kashmir.

Translations

China

Earliest translations
According to early Chinese sutra catalogues such as the Lidai Sanbao ji (歷代三寶紀), a part of the core portion of the sutra was translated previously into Chinese by Dharmarakṣa (fl. c260-280), though this version is now lost.

Faxian
Though the translation of the "six fascicle" version is conventionally ascribed to Faxian (法顯), this attribution is probably inaccurate. According to Faxian's own account, the manuscript copy forming the basis of the six juan Chinese version was obtained by him in Pāṭaliputra from the house of a layman known as Kālasena, during his travels in India. The earliest surviving Chinese sutra catalogue, Sengyou's Chu Sanzang Jiji (出三藏記集), which was written less than 100 years after the date of this translation, makes no mention of Faxian. Instead it states that the translation was done by Buddhabhadra and his assistant Baoyun (寶雲), quoting earlier catalogues to corroborate this attribution. The idea that Faxian was involved in the translation only emerges in later catalogues, compiled several hundred years after the event.

Zhimeng
Chinese canonical records also mention that a now lost translation was made by the Chinese monk Zhimeng who studied in India from 404-424 CE.  According to Zhimeng's own account, he also obtained his manuscript from the same layman in Pataliputra as Faxian did some years earlier.

Dharmakṣema
The translation done by Dharmakṣema from 421 CE onwards may for a large part be based on a non-Indian text.

The first ten fascicles may be based on a birch-bark manuscript of the Mahāparinirvāṇa-sūtra from North-Western India that Dharmakṣema brought with him, which he used for the initial translation work of his version. This version corresponds overall in content to the "six fascicle" version and the Tibetan version.

Dharmakṣema's translation of the Mahāyāna Mahāparinirvāṇa-sūtra extends for a further thirty fascicles, beyond the first ten fascicles of this sutra. Many scholars doubt if these thirty fascicles are based on an Indian Sanskrit text. The chief reasons for this skepticism are these: 
 no traces of an extended Sanskrit text has ever been found, while Sanskrit manuscript fragments of twenty four separate pages distributed right across the core portion of the Mahāparinirvāṇa-sūtra have been found over the past hundred years in various parts of Asia; 
 no quotations are known from this latter portion in any Indian commentaries or sutra anthologies;
 no other translator in China or Tibet ever found Sanskrit copies of this portion. 
 In addition, these doubts correspond with an account from the Chinese monk-translator Yijing, who mentions that he searched for a copy of the enlarged Mahaparinirvāṇa-sūtra through all that time, but only found manuscripts corresponding to the core portion of this work.

For these reasons, textual scholars generally regard the authenticity of the latter portion as dubious. It may have been a local Central Asian composition at best, or else written by Dharmakṣema himself, who had both the ability and the motive for doing so. On the strength of their investigations, certain specialist scholars have formulated and expressed a theory in which they suggest that this latter portion of the Mahāparinirvāṇa-sūtra translated by Dharmakṣema may not represent a definitive source, for scholars, for the history of the development, in India, of the Buddha-nature concept and related doctrines.

English translations
 Yamamoto, Kosho, trans. (1973-1975). The Mahayana Mahaparinirvana Sutra, 3 Volumes, Karinbunko, Ube City, Japan. Limited to 500 copies.
 Blum, Mark, trans. (2013). The Nirvana Sutra: Volume 1 (of a projected 4), Berkeley, Calif. : BDK America (distr.: Honolulu: University of Hawaii Press). .
 Kato, Yasunari, trans. (2014). Daihatsunehankyou Vol.2: Mahayana Mahaparinirvana Sutra Vol.2, CreateSpace Independent Publishing Platform.   This is a Japanese translation, not English.
 Yamamoto &  Page, Dr. Tony, trans. (2015). Nirvana Sutra: A Translation of Dharmakshema's Northern version, CreateSpace Independent Publishing Platform.  Dr. Tony Page's re-editing of Yamamoto's original.

Teachings

According to Sallie B. King, the sutra does not represent a major innovation, and is rather unsystematic, which made it "a fruitful one for later students and commentators, who were obliged to create their own order and bring it to the text". According to King, its most important innovation is the linking of the term buddhadhātu with tathagatagarbha. The "nature of the Buddha" is presented as a timeless, eternal "Self", which is akin to the tathagatagarbha, the innate possibility in every sentient being to attain Buddha-hood and manifest this timeless Buddha-nature. "[I]t is obvious that the Mahaparinirvana Sutra does not consider it impossible for a Buddhist to affirm an atman provided it is clear what the correct understanding of this concept is, and indeed the sutra clearly sees certain advantages in doing so."

Context
The Nirvana Sutra is an eschatological text. Its core was written in India in a time which was perceived as the age in which the Buddha-dharma would perish, and all the Mahayana sutras disappear. The sutra responds to this awaited end with the proclamation of the tathagatagarbha, the innate Buddhahood present in all man:

The existence of the tathagatagarbha must be taken on faith:

Buddhadhātu
A central focus of the Nirvana Sutra is the Buddha-nature, "the nature of the Buddha", that which constitutes a Buddha. According to Sally King, the sutra speaks about Buddha-nature in so many different ways, that Chinese scholars created a list of types of Buddha-nature that could be found in the text.

Buddha-nature, "true Self" and Emptiness
The buddhadhātu is described as a true self, due to its eternal nature. It is what remains when "non-Self" is discarded:

According to Dharmakṣema's extended version of the sutra, this "true Self" is eternal, unchanging, blissful, pure, inviolate and deathless: 

Paul Williams comments:

Mark Blum speaks both of the fictitious discursive self and the real Self of the Buddha-nature. Commenting both on the non-Self and Emptiness teachings of the Nirvana Sutra, he states:

"Self" as skillful means 
Paul Williams also notes that while we can speak of the tathāgatagarbha as Self "actually it is not at all a Self, and those who have such Self-notions cannot perceive the tathagatagarbha and thus become enlightened."

Williams writes:Of course, this Self is not a Self in the worldly sense taught by non-Buddhist thinkers, or maintained to exist by the much-maligned ‘man in the street’. The Buddha taught the not-Self doctrine in order to overcome the egoistic Self which is the basis for attachment and grasping (see the translation in Ruegg 1973: 81–2). Elsewhere in the large and heterogeneous Mahāparinirvāṇa Sūtra the Buddha seems rather to portray his teaching of the tathāgatagarbha  as being or entailing a Self as a strategy to convert non-Buddhists. It is said that some non-Buddhist ascetics see the Buddha and would follow him were he not a nihilist who taught not-Self. The Buddha knows their thoughts: ‘I do not say that all sentient beings lack a Self. I always say that sentient beings have the Buddha-nature (svabhāva). Is not that very Buddha-nature a Self? So I do not teach a nihilistic doctrine.’ The Buddha adds that it is because all sentient beings do not see the Buddha-nature that he teaches the four signs of impermanence, not-Self, suffering, and impurity. It is this that is thought to be a nihilistic doctrine. He has taught Self where there is really not-Self, and not-Self where there is really Self. This is not false but the Buddha’s skill-in-means, his cleverness in applying helpful stratagems. Here the Buddha-nature is really not-Self, but it is said to be a Self in a manner of speaking.

Eternal Buddha

Mark Blum stresses the fact that the Buddha in this sutra is presented, on the eve of his Great Nirvana, as one who is not subject to the processes of birth and death, but abides undying forever:

The Buddha is presented as (an) eternal Being, transcending normal human limitations:

Kosho Yamamoto gives a series of equations:

Tathagatagarbha
The Buddha-nature is equated with the Tathagatagarbha. According to Sally King, the term tathāgatagarbha may be understood in two ways:
 "embryonic tathāgata", the incipient Buddha, the cause of the Tathāgata,
 "womb of the tathāgata", the fruit of Tathāgata.
The Chinese translated the term tathāgata in its meaning as "womb", c.q. "fruit". He notes that the two major Chinese versions of the sutra don't use the literal Chinese term for embryo or womb, but speak of the "wondrous interior treasure-house of the Buddha" found in all beings. "We never see a word that specifically means embryo or womb used for garbha in either Chinese translation of this sutra."

This "hidden treasury" is present in all sentient beings: "[the Buddha] expounds the doctrine that this quality [of the hidden interior, wondrous treasury] is not only common to buddhas but to all living beings as well." The Buddha-nature is always present, in all times and in all beings. According to Liu, this does not mean that sentient beings are at present endowed with the qualities of a Buddha, but that they will have those qualities in the future. It is obscured from worldly vision by the screening effect of tenacious negative mental afflictions within each being. Once these negative mental states have been eliminated, however, the buddhadhātu is said to shine forth unimpededly and can then be consciously "entered into", and therewith deathless Nirvana attained:

Icchantikas
Despite the fact that the Buddha-nature is innate in all sentient beings, there is a class of people who are excluded from salvation, the Icchantikas, "extremists":

The longer versions of the Nirvana Sutra additionally give expression to the new claim (not found in the shorter Chinese and Tibetan versions) that, because of the Buddha-dhatu, absolutely all beings without exception, even icchantikas (the most incorrigible and spiritually base of beings), will eventually attain liberation and become Buddhas.

The Nirvana Sutra in Mahayana Schools
In the introduction to his translation of the Nirvana Sutra, Mark Blum speaks of the tremendous importance of this sutra for East-Asian Buddhism:

There is one story in the Nirvana Sutra about a blind man feeling an elephant. The elephant in this tale symbolizes the "Buddha nature". A group of blind men reach touch a different part of the elephant—one feels the tusk and thinks it is a carrot, another mistakes the elephant's belly for an urn, and so on. The king seeks that Shakyamuni illuminate their limited perception (symbolized by blindness in the parable) that permits only partial truths.

Nichiren Buddhism
In Nichiren Buddhism the Nirvana Sutra, with the Lotus Sutra, make up what Tiantai called the Fifth of the Five Periods of Teaching. The Nirvana Sutra is seen as inferior to the Lotus Sutra however, based on the passage in Nichiren´s writings that reads:

Shin Buddhism
The Nirvana Sutra is among the most important sources and influences on Shinran's magnum opus, Kyogyoshinsho, which is the foundational text of the Japanese Jōdo Shinshū Pure Land School. Shinran relies on crucial passages from the Nirvana Sutra for the more theoretical elaboration of the meaning of shinjin. The Nirvana Sutra and the Pure Land Sutras are quoted extensively in the Kyogyoshinsho.

See also
  
 Anunatva-Apurnatva-Nirdesa
 Ātman (Buddhism)
 Dolpopa Sherab Gyaltsen
 Faith in Buddhism
 God in Buddhism
 Kulayarāja Tantra
 Parinirvana
 Mahāyāna sūtras
 Nirvana (Buddhism)
 Shinjō Itō, founder of the Shinnyo-en school of Buddhism
 Śrīmālādevī Siṃhanāda Sūtra
 Buddha-nature
 Tathāgatagarbha Sūtra

Notes

References

Sources 

 
 
 
 
 
 
 
  
  
 
 
 
  (in Japanese)

Further reading
 Blum, Mark (2003). Nirvana Sutra, in: Buswell, Robert E. ed., Encyclopedia of Buddhism, New York: Macmillan Reference Lib., pp. 605–606
 Bongard-Levin, G.M (1986). New Sanskrit fragments of the Mahāyāna Mahāparinivāṇa-sūtra: Central Asian manuscript collection, The International Institute for Buddhist Studies.
 Ito, Shinjo (2009). Shinjo: Reflections, Somerset Hall Press.
 Lai, Whalen (1982). Sinitic speculations on buddha-nature: The Nirvaana school (420-589), Philosophy East and West 32 (2),  135-149
 Radich, Michael (2015). The Mahāparinivāṇa-mahasūtra and the Emergence of Tathagatagarba Doctrine, Hamburg  Buddhist Studies Vol. 5, Hamburg University Press
 Yuyama, Akira (1981). Sanskrit fragments of the Mahāyāna Mahāparinivāṇa-sūtra: Koyasan manuscript, The Reiyukai Library.

External links
 Tony Page's Nirvana Sutra website

 Revised translation of the Mahaparinirvana Sutra
 Digital Dictionary of Buddhism (log in with userID "guest")

Mahayana sutras
Nichiren Buddhism
Shentong
Buddha-nature
 
Vaipulya sutras